Sindangan, officially the Municipality of Sindangan (Subanen: Benwa Sindangan; Chavacano: Municipalidad de Sindangan), is a 1st class municipality in the province of Zamboanga del Norte, Philippines. According to the 2020 census, it has a population of 103,952 people.

With increasing investor interests, improved infrastructures, and rapid population growth over the last decade, Sindangan is the fastest-growing municipality in the province of Zamboanga del Norte. It is also the second most populous locality after the provincial capital, Dipolog, and is the biggest and the most populous municipality in the entire Zamboanga Peninsula region, followed by the municipalities of Ipil in Zamboanga Sibugay, and Molave in Zamboanga del Sur.

Due to its rapid demographic and economic growth, steps are being taken to convert the status of Sindangan from a municipality to a city in the next coming years. Once approved and ratified, Sindangan will be the third city in Zamboanga del Norte, following the cities of Dipolog and Dapitan.

Etymology
As to how Sindangan got its name, several stories have been told.

The first version narrates that a native fisherman carrying a basket full of fish was on his way home met a Guardia Civil, military guards during the Spanish regime, who asked this question, "Cuál es el nombre de este lugar, amigo?" And the Subanon fisherman who did not understand the Spanish language answered "Indangan", believing he asked on the kind of fish he caught. The stranger heard this as "Sindangan", thinking that was the exact answer to his inquiry to the fisherman about the name of the fish. From then on, the natives used Sindangan to name the place until it became into a municipality in 1936.

The town appeared in the 1734 Murillo Velarde map which was originally spelled as Sindãgan.

History

Pre-Spanish Era 
This town sets back its origin during the pre-Spanish colonization of the Philippines. Subanon people or tribe was its first inhabitants. The Subanens, a nomadic tribe of Indo-Malayan stock, were the earliest known settlers who lived along river banks or "suba", from which word they received their present tribal identity as Subanen. They built houses and sanctuaries for their shelter and formed their own 'government' ruled by the Datu.

Over the years the Moros settled also in this place and preached Islam.

Spanish Era (As a Municipal District) 
During the Spanish reign in the archipelago where towns had already been established, Sindangan was a barrio under the jurisdiction of the then municipality of Dapitan as early as 1598 to 1729, and slowly people from the Visayas islands flocked to Mindanao to find greener pasture. Christianity also propagated on this area through the effort of the Catholic missionaries like the Society of Jesus or the Jesuits, the Augustinians, and the Dominicans. One of its great missionaries was Padre Francesco Palliola, a Jesuit missionary from Nola, Italy who tirelessly preached the Christian message, perform baptisms and sacraments and helped the tribal people in this area of Zamboanga Peninsula. He was assigned in Dapitan and Katipunan, and met his martyrdom in the barrio of Ponot (now Jose Dalman) where he was killed by the Subanen people through the leadership of their chieftain. Later on, the barrio of Sindangan was transferred under the newly established town of Lubungan (now Katipunan, who also was then a barrio of Dapitan) since the 19th century, unconnected by road.

Commonwealth Era (As a separate Municipality) 

On December 23, 1936, Sindangan was separated from the municipality of Katipunan and became an independent municipality by virtue of Executive Order No. 77 issued by President of the Commonwealth of the Philippines, Manuel L. Quezon. The municipalities of Sindangan, Siocon, Margosatubig, Pagadian, and Kabasalan were created out of the municipal districts of Sindangan, Panganuran, Labangan, Dinas, Sibuko, Sirawai, Margosatubig, Malangas, Kabasalan and Bangaan. The Municipality of Sindangan covered the area of Sindangan and Panganuran.

Bartolome Lira Sr. was appointed to organize the Municipality of Sindangan and was its first Municipal President. As his appointive tenure expired, he was elected as the first Municipal Mayor of Sindangan until 1941.

In 1955, four barrios of were created:
 Dicoyong - sitios of Labakid, Layawan, Morob, Gusani, Domalogdog, Maoal, Nato, Diongan, Makasing, Dipolo and Dicoyong Proper;
 Bacungan - sitios of Palandok, Rison, Bogabongan, Manil, Gusao, Talinga and Bacungan Proper;
 Lagag - sitios of Milaub, Mangalop, Gopit, Pase, Lipaga, Mianib, Siayan, Litolit, Balok, and Lagag Proper; and Bitoon - sitios of Misok, Hagonoy, Lico, Guban, Makinong, and Bitoon Proper
Binuangan - sitios of Taguicon, Upper Binuangan, and Gusapong Proper

In 1959, the sitios of Gonayen, Gowayan, Domogok, Dinoyak, Mangilay, Pange, Balak, Laclac, Siriac, Macasing and Diongan were constituted into the barrio of Gonayen.

At the time of its creation as an independent municipality, Sindangan had the biggest territory in terms of land area in the then Province of Zamboanga (now the administrative region Zamboanga Peninsula with three separate provinces). It once comprised the current municipalities of Sindangan, Siayan, Leon B. Postigo, Salug, Godod, Liloy, Tampilisan, Labason, Gutalac, and Kalawit. With these measurements as evidenced, Sindangan was deemed to be bigger than the present land area of Zamboanga City before its division.

It was during the Third Philippine Republic when Sindangan started to subsequently lost a huge portion of its territories after the creation of its offspring municipalities, namely: Labason (1947), Liloy (1951), Siayan (1967), and Leon B. Postigo (1982). These following municipalities mentioned also went a reduction of their territories later in the years in light of the creation of newer municipalities, making Sindangan their mother and grandmother town.

Since its elevation to a municipality in 1936, people from Luzon and the Visayas continued migrating to Sindangan to settle together with their families and built businesses. That is why aside from the Subanens, there are Sindanganons whose origins are from Bohol, Cebu, Samar, Leyte, Negros, Bicol, Pampanga, and Manila.

Shin'yō Maru incident 
The Shinyō Maru incident occurred in the Sindangan Bay,  Philippines on September 7, 1944, in the Pacific theater of World War II. In an attack on a Japanese convoy by the American submarine USS Paddle, 668 Allied prisoners of war were massacred by the Japanese or killed when their ship, the SS Shinyō Maru was sunk. Only 82 Americans survived the ordeal and were later rescued.

Cityhood
People today in the Zamboanga Peninsula region often hear about the town’s push for cityhood. Sindangan had long surpassed two out of the three requirements for cityhood status as mandated by the Local Government Code — its land area and total population. With an increasing number of investors in the last five years since 2017, the town is hopeful to meet the minimum annual income requirement of 100 million by the end of 2025. The local government unit has initiated a campaign called “Damgo Dos Mil Baynte Singko [Eng: The 2025 Vision]” where ambitious projects and massive remodelings  are being done in all its vicinity to address the town’s inadequacies, aiming to improve its facilities, and make Sindangan a conducive place for investment in the upcoming years. With its vision to become the third city in Zamboanga del Norte (after Dipolog and Dapitan), and the sixth in the Zamboanga Peninsula region (after Dipolog, Dapitan, Pagadian, Isabela, and Zamboanga), the municipal government of Sindangan is venturing into big steps in order to make the grade and finally be able to file a bill in the congress for its conversion from a first class municipality to a chartered component city.

Geography 
Sindangan lies on the northwest corridor of Zamboanga del Norte. Its diverse geography ranges from Sulu Sea on the west and southwest, the Municipality of Leon Postigo on the south, the Municipality of Siayan on the east, the Municipality of Bayog, Zamboanga del Sur on the southeast, and the Municipality of Jose Dalman on the north. Ranging from plain, slightly rolling, hilly to mountainous terrains, the Municipality of Sindangan embraces 45,100 hectares of land. Of its 52 barangays, 22 are situated along the seacoast, bountifully blessed with marine resources which gained Sindangan the title “the fishing capital of Zamboanga del Norte.”

It is approximately 86 kilometers away from Dipolog and 234 kilometers away from Zamboanga City. Hence, the municipality is identified as the trading hub of the province considering, this is a major terminal point for links to Dipolog down to Ipil and further down south to Zamboanga City.

Climate

Barangays
Sindangan is politically subdivided into 52 barangays, the most of the 27 local government units in Zamboanga del Norte.

Barangay Mandih, Poblacion, and Siari are the most densely populated areas of Sindangan as of the latest count.

Demographics

Population 
Sindangan is the first (and currently the only) municipality in Zamboanga Peninsula to reach the 100,000 population mark. As of the 2020 census, the town has a population of 103,952 people, making it the second largest local government unit in the province of Zamboanga del Norte after the provincial capital city of Dipolog. Despite being a municipality, it is 20,000 people ahead of the population of the city of Dapitan and is twice or three times more of the population of every municipality in the province compared, making Sindangan the most populous municipality in Zamboanga del Norte. It is also the most populous municipality in Region IX.

Sindangan is populated by tri-people – the Subanens, Muslims, and the Christian migrants coming from Luzon and Visayan islands.

Community-Based Monitoring System puts the number of Subanens as 24,640 or 27.5 percent of the total population with the greater number of them living in the interior barangays. The Muslims – Maranao and Tausug merchants live and ply their trades in Poblacion and its adjoining barangays.

As of 2019, Sindangan has a stronghold of 62,741 registered voters.

Religion 
Roman Catholicism strongly dominates Sindangan as shown by their religious festivities and fiestas. Famous to these Catholic Devotion is the Diocesan Shrine of the Divine Mercy in Barangay Siari where thousands of pilgrims flocked from all over the region to pray and visit to the shrine. Other Christian denominations are also present in Sindangan as well as Islam.

Economy 

Sindangan’s economy is mainly focused on agriculture and fishing. It has a plain and elevated geography that is ideal for planting crops. Among its primary agricultural products are rice, corn, banana, and vegetable crops that is typically grown on its outlying barangays and are brought by batches in the town center every Sunday morning. Being a coastal town, Sindangan boasts its fresh sea products coming from the abundant waters of the Sindangan Bay. The municipality has been the main supplier of sea products in landlocked municipalities such as Siayan in Zamboanga del Norte, and the towns of Dumingag, Mahayag, Sominot, Midsalip, and Molave in Zamboanga del Sur, thus earning Sindangan the nickname as the “Fishing Capital”. More than that, the town is also famous of its varieties of fresh and dried fish products and its local restaurants known as “Sutukil”.

The Internal Revenue Allotment of the municipality for Year 2014 is P161,572, 290.00. For the past five years, the IRA has been varying and increasing except for the year 2012 which has decreased by 2.8% from the previous year. This year's IRA has an increase of 12% compared to last year which is P 141,862,067.00.

Income from local sources for 2012 amounted to P 17,457,998.60 which has an increase of about 14.5% from the previous year. In 2009, the local income recorded is P 9,548,248.00 and has an increase of 20% by the following year which amounted to P13,080,838.79. Its major income relies on fishing and agriculture. There is also significant growth in the town's business firms as it rises on the past years.

In 2015, the Gross Sales of registered firms in Sindangan amounted to 1,062,872,781.00 PHP and expects to rise significantly in the next following years. Financial institutions are also growing in the town, as of 2015, it has 42 institutions and banks catering the Sindanganons financially.

The health capacity and services of Sindangan is significantly improving as health workers such as Doctors, Nurses, Midwives, etc., are growing. On 2014, there are 90 health servers in the town both in public and in private.

Government

Sindangan's local government structure is composed of one mayor, one vice mayor and eight councilors, named as Sangguniang Bayan members, all elected through popular vote. Two ex officio members are added to the Sangguniang Bayan with one representing Sindangan's 52 Barangay Captains being the Association of Barangay Councils (ABC) President, and one representing Sindangan's 52 Barangay Youth Council Presidents being the Sangunniang Kabataan (SK) Federation President. Each official, with the exemption of the ABC and SK Presidents, is elected publicly to a 3-year term and can be re-elected up to 3 terms in succession.

Transportation 
Tricycles, 'trisikads' and 'habal-habal' are the common public transport in the town center, both uptown and downtown. Racal Motorcycles are also emerging as public transportation in the town.

By Land 
The Sindangan Integrated Bus Terminal in Barangay Goleo is served by numerous public land transports such as the RTMI Buses (Rural Transit) via National Highway. It provides daily transport from Dipolog, Ipil, to Zamboanga City. SUVs or 'van', Ceres Liners and jeepneys are also available for daily transport. Trips to Pagadian City has also been already operational via Sindangan-Siayan-Dumingag-Mahayag road.

By Sea 

The Port of Sindangan is a seaport located in Barangay Calatunan, facing the Sindangan Bay. It is currently managed under the Philippine Ports Authority (PPA) and is considered as the main gateway of the town's economy. Recently, since June 2022, the port is already operating regular RORO trips to and from the cities of Dumaguete and Cebu.

Sports 

Sports life and social recreation are active in the life of the Sindanganons. They have a lot of sports activities to offer. The town was also energized as the Sindangan Cultural and Sports Complex, one of the biggest in the province, was made into a reality. The complex consists of an outdoor basketball and tennis court, an olympic-size swimming pool, diving board, musical and dancing fountain, and a coliseum-type sports center, known as the SinDome, that is capable of handling concerts, pageants, seminars, and other related events.

Today, the sports complex can already be used for big events such as provincial meets, regional meets, and during the annual celebration of the Linggo ng Sindangan.

In addition, each barangay in Sindangan is equipped woth a covered court that is capable of handling barangay events and community gatherings.

Tourism
These are only some of its places of interest and recreation.

Sindangan River Boardwalk Esplanade 
The Sindangan River Boardwalk Esplanade, more commonly referred to as the Sindangan Sunset Boulevard, is an under-construction esplanade on the bank of the Sindangan River, initially spanning from the national highway of Barangay Goleo to the southern portion of Barangay Lawis. It is now on its completing stage of its phase 1 development and will soon serve as a recreation site for tourists and local Sindanganons. When completed, it will span at an approximate total of 8 kilometers from the northern end of the Piao Bridge in Barangay Goleo to the eastern portion of the Port of Sindangan in Barangay Calatunan, which will then be an ideal site for street festivals and sporting events like marathons and triathlons.

Shrines and Churches 

Saint Joseph the Worker church became a parish on December 29, 1935 under the Archdiocese of Zamboanga; separating its administration to St. Francis Xavier Parish in Katipunan, Zamboanga del Norte. The first church building was first erected at Saint Joseph School (College), then it was moved to its present spot. The parish is now under the Roman Catholic Diocese of Dipolog.
The Diocesan Shrine of The Divine Mercy, Diocese of Dipolog, was declared as one of the pilgrim spot for the Jubilee Year of Mercy (2015-2016). It is administered by Rev. Fr. Danilo Alpuerto.
 Statue of the Sacred Heart of Jesus and Our Lady of Fatima
Saint Joseph the Worker Parish, Poblacion, Sindangan (since 1935)
 Sr. Santo Nino Parish, Siari, Sindangan
 Immaculate Conception Piao Parish
 Our Lady of the Assumption Chapel, Dapaon, Sindangan

Resorts

Commerce 
Sindangan is known as a melting pot of businesses and investors due to its strategic and promising location. It is the second commercial hub of the province next to Dipolog.

Retail Centers

Fast Food and Resto

Hotels

Motor and Appliance Dealers

Banking institutions 
There are 42 financial institutions as of 2015.

Education 
Education is widely distributed in Sindangan.

Sindangan has two college institutions, both religious, the St. Joseph College of Sindangan Incorporated (SJCSI) and the Philippine Advent College (PAC). Both offer courses in education, liberal arts, and computer sciences. PAC consistently produces nurses passing the board.

The town has fifty-seven (57) elementary schools, ten (10) secondary schools. Five are situated in the outlying barangays and four (4) in the urban barangays.

A TESDA training center in Barangay Goleo offers technical courses and training to qualified students.

In 2021, an extension campus of the Mindanao State University was formally opened in Sindangan.

Universities

Mindanao State University Main Campus - Sindangan Extension

Colleges 

Saint Joseph College of Sindangan, Inc. was founded on March 19, 1968, as Saint Joseph High School and eventually became the first college institution in Sindangan. The college was owned and supervised by The Roman Catholic Diocese of Dipolog until now together with its other institutions like Saint Vincent's College in Dipolog, and Saint Estanislaus Kostka College in Manukan, Zamboanga del Norte. 
List of the College Presidents in the Diocese 
1.+Most. Rev. Felix Sanchez Zafra, D.D. -first bishop of the Diocese of Dipolog appointed by Pope Paul VI on July 31, 1967. He was transferred as Bishop of the Diocese of Tagbilaran by Pope John Paul II on October 20, 1986. By then, the seat of the bishop of the diocese was vacant for more or less 7 months. 
2. Most. Rev. Jose Ricare Manguiran, D.D. - appointed by Pope John Paul II as second bishop of the Diocese of Dipolog on May 27, 1987, until his retirement on July 25, 2014. 
3. Most. Rev. Severo Cagatan Caermare, D.D. -appointed by Pope Francis on July 25, 2014, as third bishop of the diocese.

Philippine Advent College, Sindangan, formerly known as Hillside View College, a Christian college founded in Sindangan on 1975. Its current president is Mr. Pio M. Cernal.

High schools 

 Saint Joseph College of Sindangan, Incorporated, High School Department
 Philippine Advent College, High School Department
 Sindangan National Agricultural School
 Siare John H. Roemer Memorial National High School
 Bartolome Lira National High School
 Dumalogdog National High School
 Sindangan National High School
 Lapero National High School
 Dona Natividad L. Macias Integrated School, High School Department

Culture

Saint Joseph the Worker Town Fiesta- May 1 (Labor's Day) 
Honors the Primary Patron Saint of the town, Saint Joseph the Worker, Husband of the Virgin Mary and the foster father of Jesus Christ. He is entitled as "El Obrero" or "the Worker" because he is a modest carpenter who works hard to earn a living for the Holy Family and a role model and patron saint for all Fathers and Labor Workers. He is fit to become the town's patron saint because the people of Sindangan are known as hard-worker laborers since the pre-second world war.

Sinulog Festival- Siari's Feast Day (3rd Sunday of January) 
In honor of the Santo Nino de Cebu, a grand fluvial procession at the eve of the fiesta is celebrated in Barangay Siari. On the day of the fiesta, a street dance procession is held and a Sinulog Dance Competition follows at the end of the procession.

Pasidungog Festival 
One of Sindangan's grand festival in honor of the school and the town's patron saint itself - Saint Joseph the Worker. Saint Joseph College's Founding Anniversary happens on March 19 during the Solemnity of Saint Joseph, the Husband of Mary.

Linggo ng Sindangan 

An annual celebration that commemorates the municipal charter day of Sindangan. The celebration usually starts on the 17th of December and ends on 22nd. During the course of the week-long event, competitions and shows are usually held such as trade fairs, amateur boxing, motorcross, singing competitions, firework shows, and many more. Mainly, the celebration is highlighted by a beauty pageant competition. Dubbed as the biggest beauty pageant in the entire Zamboanga Peninsula region, the annual search for the Binibining Sindangan has caused headlines and draws hundreds of applicants from throughout the country with its prestigious production and generous grand and consolation prizes.  The winner of the most recent competition, which took place in December 2022, took home a brand-new car along with a cash reward of 500,000 pesos.

Media

Radio stations
DXSZ-FM 97.7 Charm Radio Sindangan (CyVon Broadcasting Services, Sindangan. Adolana Broadcasting Network and Polytechnic Foundation of Cotabato and Asia Incorporated. Independently managed and franchised) Tag line- "Where your heart belongs." " Ang paborito ng bayan!" Charm Radio Sindangan- Most popular radio station in town. (Under Maintenance) 
DXRF-FM 92.1 Radyo Natin (Manila Broadcasting Company) First established radio station in Sindangan. Tag line- "Your friendly hometown radio station." "Iba pa rin ang orig!" Managed by Mr. Bobby Jamora
DXST-FM 95.3 Prime FM (Prime Broadcasting Network)
DXSW-FM 105.3 Brigada News FM (Brigada Mass Media Corporation) SOON TO AIR
DXAZ-FM 100.9 One FM (Radio Corporation of the Philippines) SOON TO AIR
DXXE-FM 106.1 Yes The Best (Manila Broadcasting Company)

Cable providers
Prime Cable Network
Amatec Cable TV
Cignal Digital TV
Sky Direct

Notable people

Junrey Balawing, former Filipino record holder for the world's shortest man alive
General Alexander B. Yano, 38th Chief of Staff of the Armed Forces of the Philippines

References

External links
 Sindangan Profile at PhilAtlas.com
 [ Philippine Standard Geographic Code]
Philippine Census Information
Sindanganon website

Municipalities of Zamboanga del Norte
Establishments by Philippine executive order